1G refers to the first generation of cellular network (wireless) technology. These are mobile telecommunications standards that were introduced in the 1980s and were superseded by 2G. The main difference between these two mobile cellular generations is that the audio transmissions of 1G networks were analog, while 2G networks were entirely digital.

There were many different 1G cellular standards developed and used in different countries, but the most widely adopted globally were the Nordic Mobile Telephone (NMT) and Advanced Mobile Phone System (AMPS) systems. The inherent advantages of digital technology over that of analog meant that 2G networks went on to eventually completely replace them. Many 1G networks were switched off in developed economies by 2000, but in some places networks continued to operate into the 2010s.

Overview
The antecedent to 1G technology is the mobile radio telephone (i.e. "0G"), where portable phones would connect to a centralised operator. 1G refers to the very first generation of cellular networks. Cellular technology employ a network of cells throughout a geographical area using low-power radio transmitters.

History 
The first commercial cellular network was launched in Japan by Nippon Telegraph and Telephone (NTT) in 1979, initially in the metropolitan area of Tokyo. The first phone that used this network was called TZ-801 built by Panasonic. Within five years, the NTT network had been expanded to cover the whole population of Japan and became the first nationwide 1G/cellular network. Before the network in Japan, Bell Laboratories built the first cellular network around Chicago in 1977 and trialled it in 1978.

As in the pre-cellular era, the Nordic countries were among the pioneers in wireless technologies. These countries together designed the NMT standard which first launched in Sweden in 1981. NMT was the first mobile phone network to feature international roaming. In 1983, the first 1G cellular network launched in the United States, which was Chicago-based Ameritech using the Motorola DynaTAC mobile phone.

In the early to mid 1990s, 1G was superseded by newer 2G (second generation) cellular technologies such as GSM and cdmaOne. Although 1G also used digital signaling to connect the radio towers (which listen to the handsets) to the rest of the telephone system, the voice itself during a call is encoded to digital signals in 2G whereas 1G is only modulated to higher frequency, typically 150 MHz and up. Most 1G networks had been discontinued by the early 2000s. Some regions especially Eastern Europe continued running these networks for much longer. The last operating 1G network was closed down in Russia in 2017.

Adoption
After Japan, the earliest commercial cellular networks launched in 1981 in Sweden, Norway and Saudi Arabia, followed by Denmark, Finland and Spain in 1982, the U.S. in 1983 and Hong Kong, South Korea, Austria and Canada in 1984. By 1986 networks had also launched in Tunisia, Malaysia, Oman, Ireland, Italy, Luxembourg, Netherlands, United Kingdom, West Germany, France, South Africa, Israel, Thailand, Indonesia, Iceland, Turkey, the Virgin Islands and Australia. Generally, African countries were slower to take up 1G networks, while Eastern European were among the last due to the political situation.

In Europe, the United Kingdom had the largest number of cellular subscribers as of 1990 numbering 1.1 million, while the second largest market was Sweden with 482 thousand. Although Japan was the first country with a nationwide cellular network, the number of users was significantly lower than other developed economies with a penetration rate of only 0.15 percent in 1989. As of January 1991, the highest penetration rates were in Sweden and Finland with both countries above 50 percent closely followed by Norway and Iceland. The United States had a rate of 21.2 percent. In most other European countries it was below 10 percent.

1G standards
Analogue cellular technologies that were used were:
Advanced Mobile Phone System (AMPS)
Nordic Mobile Telephone (NMT)
Total Access Communication System (TACS) developed in the United Kingdom and also some other parts of the world
C-450 developed in West Germany and also adopted in Portugal and South Africa
Radiocom 2000 in France (France Telecom only)
RTMI in Italy
MCS-L1 and MCS-L2 (developed by NTT) in Japan
JTACS (a variant of TACS operated by Daini Denden Planning, Inc. (DDI)) in Japan

See also 
 List of mobile phone generations
 2G
 3G
 3.5G
 4G
 4.5G
 5G
 Wireless Application Protocol
 Wireless device radiation and health

References

Bibliography

External links 
 Glossary: 1G - First Generation wireless technology
 Glossary: Detailed Description on 1G Technology

        
        
        
        
        

Mobile telecommunications
Japanese inventions
Wireless communication systems